Homespun was an English pop/folk band formed in 2003 by Dave Rotheray, ex-songwriter and musician from the 15 million record selling band The Beautiful South. Homespun was originally a side project, designed as an outlet for Rotheray’s solo compositions. Other band members were Sam Brown, Melvin Duffy, Tony Robinson, Clare Mactaggart, Gary Hammond and Alan Jones.

The band recorded three critically acclaimed albums, Homespun (2003), Effortless Cool (2005) and Short Stories From East Yorkshire (2008). On this final album, Rotheray introduced guest vocals to the format, with contributions from Eleanor McEvoy and Mary Coughlan. All the Homespun albums and singles were released on Rotheray’s own Homespun Recordings label.

The band toured the UK four times, playing mostly in folk clubs and small venues. The band split up in August 2008, with Rotheray stating his intention to pursue a solo career. All other band members are still active in music. For example Melvin Duffy joined Squeeze in 2019, having played as a session musician on Squeeze's previous two albums, and at occasional live shows.

Discography

Albums

Homespun (2003)
Track listing
Unfortunately Young
Did You Ever?
Don't Force Me to be Free
Anniversary Rag
Let Me Be Good
I'm In Your Head
Lonely Together
Days
Your Radio
Footsteps
Sundial

Effortless Cool (2005)
Track listing
Sweetness
If We're So Happy
Love Will Come Around
Italy
Effortless Cool
Rubber Duck
A Minute
Whistlestop Blues
Cosy Island Lullaby
The Reluctant Sailor
If God Was A Girl
You Are Here

Short Stories From East Yorkshire (2008)
Track listing
Short Story
My Sorrows Learned To Swim
Happiness Passes
Driver
First People On Earth
Memo To Self
Magician's Daughter
Yorkshire Ghost
Watching
Lover's Chapel
Screen Goes Black
Rendezvous Roulade

Singles

If We're So Happy (2005)
If We're So Happy
Whistlestop Blues
Lonely Together

Effortless Cool (2005)
Effortless Cool (single version)
Unfortunately Young
We Can Swing Together (live)

References

External links
 Homespun official website

English folk musical groups
Musical groups established in 2003